Stephen Grant or Steven Grant may refer to:

Stephen Grant (comedian) (born 1973), British comedian and radio presenter
Stephen Grant (footballer) (born 1977), Irish golfer and former footballer
Stephen Grant, murderer of Tara Lynn Grant
Steve Grant (born 1969), American football player
 Steve Grant, British singer, member of Tight Fit
 Steven Grant (born 1953), comic book writer
 Steven B. Grant, mayor of Boynton Beach, Florida
 Steven Grant (character), one identity of the Marvel Comics fictional character Moon Knight
 Steven Grant (Marvel Cinematic Universe), the character's Marvel Cinematic Universe counterpart